The Quepano were a band of American Indians that lived in the region around Cerralvo, in northeastern Nuevo León, near the end of the seventeenth century; some were also known to be at the San Antonio de Valero Mission in San Antonio during the first half of the next century.  They appear to have been Coahuiltecans.

External link
Handbook of Texas entry

Native American tribes in Texas
People from Cerralvo, Nuevo León